Liberty Hall is a historic building located at Quakertown, Bucks County, Pennsylvania. It was built in 1772 as the first permanent residence in Quakertown. It is a two-story,  by 15 feet building with one room per floor. It is constructed of native fieldstone and has a half gambrel roof. It represents simple colonial Quaker construction.

The Liberty Bell is purported to have been hidden on the property overnight on its way to Allentown, PA. In 1777, the Continental Congress had decreed the bell be moved before the British Army melted it down for ammunition. On the night of 23 September 1777, six days after the Liberty Bell left Philadelphia, it was stored overnight behind Evan Foulke's house near The Red Lion Inn at the corner of Broad and Main Streets in Quakertown.  The next day it continued on its journey to Allentown to be hidden for the remainder of the Revolutionary War.  It remained in use as a residence until 1805, when a new dwelling was constructed. It was used for farm storage and later for commercial purposes. It was purchased by the borough of Quakertown in 1977.

It was added to the National Register of Historic Places in 1978.

See also
National Register of Historic Places listings in Bucks County, Pennsylvania

References

External links

Houses on the National Register of Historic Places in Pennsylvania
Houses completed in 1772
Tourist attractions in Bucks County, Pennsylvania
Historic American Buildings Survey in Pennsylvania
Houses in Bucks County, Pennsylvania
National Register of Historic Places in Bucks County, Pennsylvania